The Zürich Opera Ball is a Swiss society event, fundraiser, and debutante ball held annually at the Zürich Opera House. The ball serves as a fundraiser for the Zürich Opera and Ballett Zürich.

Description 
The Zürich Opera Ball, held annually in March, was created as a fundraiser for the Zürich Opera and Ballett Zürich and is held in the Zürich Opera House. The ball is opened with the presentation of debutantes. Jewels for the debutantes are provided by the jewelry house Gübelin. The debutante presentation is followed by musical and ballet performances, a formal dinner, and a ball. A society event, the ball is a part of Zürich's social season and is attended by celebrities, members of the Swiss nobility, and other prominent people.

In 2020 the ball was cancelled due to the COVID-19 pandemic in Switzerland.

References 

Annual events in Switzerland
Dance in Switzerland
Debutante balls
Entertainment events in Switzerland
Events in Zürich
Music events in Switzerland
Spring (season) events in Switzerland